Mean inter-particle distance (or mean inter-particle separation) is the mean distance between microscopic particles (usually atoms or molecules) in a macroscopic body.

Ambiguity

From the very general considerations, the mean inter-particle distance is proportional to the size of the per-particle volume , i.e., 
 
where  is the particle density. However, barring a few simple cases such as the ideal gas model, precise calculations of the proportionality factor are impossible analytically. Therefore, approximate expressions are often used. One such an estimation is the Wigner–Seitz radius
 
which corresponds to the radius of a sphere having per-particle volume . Another popular definition is
 ,
corresponding to the length of the edge of the cube with the per-particle volume . On the other hand, it is often used in qualitative statements where such a numeric factor is either irrelevant or plays an insignificant role, e.g.,

 "a potential energy ... is proportional to some power n of the inter-particle distance r" (Virial theorem)
 "the inter-particle distance is much larger than the thermal de Broglie wavelength" (Kinetic theory)

Ideal gas

Nearest neighbor distribution

We want to calculate probability distribution function of distance to the nearest neighbor (NN) particle. (The problem was first considered by Paul Hertz; for a modern derivation see, e.g.,.) Let us assume  particles inside a sphere having volume , so that . Note that since the particles in the ideal gas are non-interacting, the probability to find a particle at a certain distance from another particle is the same as probability to find a particle at the same distance from any other point; we shall use the center of the sphere.

An NN particle at distance  means exactly one of the  particles resides at that distance while the rest 
 particles are at larger distances, i.e., they are somewhere outside the sphere with radius .

The sought-for expression is then

where we substituted
 
Note that  is the Wigner-Seitz radius. Finally, taking the  limit and using , we obtain

One can immediately check that

The distribution peaks at

Mean distance and higher moments

or, using the  substitution,

where  is the gamma function. Thus,

In particular,

References

See also
 Wigner–Seitz radius

Concepts in physics
Density